Belgian railway line 49 connects Welkenraedt with Eupen. In its early days the line also connected to Raeren.

References

 This article is based on a translation of the equivalent page on the Dutch language Wikipedia.

Liège Province
49
Railway lines opened in 1864